The Kalimawe Game Controlled Area is found in Tanzania. It was established in 1974. This site is 300 km.

References

Protected areas of Tanzania
Protected areas established in 1974
1974 establishments in Tanzania